Telecom Armenia CJSC (formerly Armentel and VEON Armenia) is an Armenian broadband and telecommunications company. Telecom Armenia, an integrated telecommunications services operator, is headquartered in Yerevan.

History 
Telecom Armenia CJSC was found as "Armentel" in March 1995. On 3 November 2006, it became a subsidiary of the Russian corporation VimpelCom (later called VEON) and started operating under the Beeline brand. The company was renamed to "VEON Armenia" sometime in 2017. On 29 October 2020, TEAM LLC acquired 100% of the company's shares using credit funds, and renamed the company to "Telecom Armenia CJSC". Telecom Armenia currently belongs to "TEAM LLC", which was founded by Hayk and Alexandr Yesayan.

Telecom Armenia CJSC formerly operated under the Beeline brand.

Telecom Armenia provides telephone communication services GSM 900/1800, 3G (UMTS) and standard mobile communication 4G (LTE), fixed telephone communication, and also provides Internet access using CDMA, ADSL, FTTB and VDSL technologies.

The headquarters of Telecom Armenia is located in Yerevan, on Azatutyan avenue 24/1.

Operations
Telecom Armenia CJSC provides services of GSM 900/1800, 3G (UMTS) and 4G (LTE) standard mobile communication, fixed telephony as well as Internet access based on CDMA, ADSL and FTTB technologies under Beeline brand on the whole territory of Armenia.

Since 2007, Beeline has been consistently developing broadband internet access services by ADSL technology - Hi-Line, and in March 2012, the company brought into commercial operation Internet access service by FTTB technology - Hi-Line Optic, the inhabitants of the city Gyumri were the first to experience the new service. In 2008, Telecom Armenia CJSC became the first Armenian mobile operator to launch 3G network. Beeline 3G network covers more than 350 Armenian settlements with population of more than 2,9 million. In 2016 Beeline started providing services of 4G network.

As of the end of 2013, Yerevan's urban telephone network was 100% digitized. The countrywide digitalization index is 94%.

Controversy 
The merge and acquisition of Beeline Armenia to TEAM LLC is currently disputed in court, initiated by Ucom, the competitor telecommunications company and the previous home of TEAM LLC's founders. The Yerevan Court of General Jurisdiction proceeds the case of unfair competition committed by TEAM LLC. It is known, that in January 2020 VEON confirmed discussions with Ucom LLC regarding a potential transaction in Armenia, however withdrew it in May 2020. It is reported, that the knowledge of VEON deal is appropriated by TEAM LLC founders via violating employment terms.

See also 

 Telecommunications in Armenia

References 

Companies of Armenia
Telecommunications in Armenia
Telecommunications companies of Armenia
Armenian brands
VEON
Armenian companies established in 1995
Telecommunications companies established in 1995